John Victor "Rhino" Edwards (born 9 May 1953) is an English bass guitarist, playing in the rock group Status Quo.

Career 
Born in Chiswick, London, Edwards learnt classical violin as a child and won a scholarship to the London College of Music at the age of eleven. He was educated at Chiswick Grammar School and Stinsford School, Dorchester.

Around 1973–4, Edwards was to be found playing simultaneously in two pub bands in The White Bear in Hounslow (a venue renowned at that time as a music venue, where Rick Wakeman had been a regular player).  The two bands were The Sunday Band (playing on that day of the week), playing covers of rock standards, and Rococo, with a regular Friday slot, and sharing the same singer as well as bass player.  Rococo released a single "Ultrastar"/"Wildfire" on Decca Deram in 1973.

Later on he joined Judie Tzuke's backing band, where he was given the nickname "Rhino" for being clumsy.

Edwards has played with Peter Green, ex-Fleetwood Mac, Climax Blues Band, Judie Tzuke and Dexys Midnight Runners.

Edwards was working with drummer Jeff Rich, when Status Quo guitarist Rick Parfitt approached them both to work on his solo album Recorded Delivery. When Status Quo reformed with a new lineup in 1986, Edwards and Rich were called in to replace founding member Alan Lancaster and drummer Pete Kircher.

He released the album Rhino's Revenge in 2000, on which some tracks featured other members of Status Quo. Recently he has played a small number of gigs in the UK and Europe with Woodedz, playing alongside his children.

As a fan of Brentford F.C., Edwards wrote a song  in early 2006 about striker Lloyd Owusu's return to the club for the start of that football season.

Equipment
Edwards owns several different basses from different manufacturers, including Rickenbacker and Wal. However while playing live with Status Quo he uses Status basses, mainly two headless four stringed and a five stringed model. For amplification he uses a Markbass F1 amp with 2 4x10 horn loaded cabinets, with a repeater amp on the other side of the stage through a regular Marshall 4 x 12 cabinet. During the song "Gerdundula", Edwards plays a Tanglewood guitar through a Marshall JCM800 head and a 4x12 cabinet.

Family
Edwards's son Freddie is a guitarist. In October 2014 he accompanied Status Quo on stage at The Roundhouse in London, in a concert broadcast live by BBC Radio 2, to launch the band's album Aquostic (Stripped Bare). He is also a member of the subsequent Aquostic touring version of the band  and a member of the band Flawes. After Parfitt's 2016 retirement from the band, due to ill health, Freddie also performed in place of Parfitt for shows in July and August. 

Edwards's daughter Mae and son Max are both drummers.

References

External links 

 Status Quo official website
 Rhinos Revenge official website

1953 births
Living people
People from Chiswick
English rock bass guitarists
Male bass guitarists
Status Quo (band) members